Eubule is a genus of leaf-footed bugs in the family Coreidae. There are about 13 described species in Eubule.

Species
 Eubule ampliata Valdés, 1910
 Eubule bachmanni Brailovsky, 1992
 Eubule farinosa (Dallas, 1852)
 Eubule glyphica Berg, 1879
 Eubule nigra Brailovsky, 1992
 Eubule rugulosa Brailovsky, 1992
 Eubule sandaracine Brailovsky, 1987
 Eubule sculpta (Perty, 1830)
 Eubule scutellata (Westwood, 1842)
 Eubule serrator (Fabricius, 1803)
 Eubule spartocerana Brailovsky, 1992
 Eubule subdepressa Breddin, 1903
 Eubule trilineata (Signoret, 1861)

References

 Baranowski, Richard M., and Holly Glenn (1996). "The first record of Eubule ampliata from the United States with notes on its biology (Hemiptera: Coreidae)". The Florida Entomologist, vol. 79, no. 4, 595–599.
 Packauskas, Richard (2010). "Catalog of the Coreidae, or Leaf-Footed Bugs, of the New World". Fort Hays Studies, Fourth Series, no. 5, 270.
 Thomas J. Henry, Richard C. Froeschner. (1988). Catalog of the Heteroptera, True Bugs of Canada and the Continental United States. Brill Academic Publishers.
 Walker, Francis (1871). Catalogue of the Specimens of Hemiptera Heteroptera in the Collection of the British Museum, pt. IV, 211.

Further reading

 Arnett, Ross H. (2000). American Insects: A Handbook of the Insects of America North of Mexico. CRC Press.

Spartocerini
Coreidae genera